Manfred Seidel (born 25 August 1949) is a German athlete. He competed in the men's hammer throw at the 1976 Summer Olympics.

References

1949 births
Living people
Athletes (track and field) at the 1976 Summer Olympics
German male hammer throwers
Olympic athletes of East Germany
Sportspeople from Saxony-Anhalt